Hesse is both a cultural region of Germany and the name of an individual German state.

Hesse may also refer to:

 Hesse (surname)
 Greater Hesse, a German territory created by the US military administration at the end of World War II (1945–46)
 Landgraviate of Hesse (1264–1567)
 Lower Hesse
 Upper Hesse
 Grand Duchy of Hesse (1806–1918)
 People's State of Hesse (1918–45)
 Hesse, Moselle, a place in Lorraine, France
 Landgraviate of Hesse-Darmstadt
 Hesse District, Upper Canada or Western District
 Landgraviate of Hesse-Kassel
 Electorate of Hesse
 Province of Kurhessen
 Hesse (Blakes, Virginia), a historic plantation house
 Hesse, Victoria, Australia

Sports
 KSV Hessen Kassel, an association football club from Kassel, Hesse
 SC Hessen Dreieich, an association football club from Dreieich, Hesse

See also 
History of Hesse
List of rulers of Hesse
Carlingue or Active Group Hesse
 Hesse's Rule in zoology
 Hesse configuration

 Hess (disambiguation)
 Hessen (disambiguation)